Arthur James Robinson (June 8, 1943 – February 15, 2018), better known as Mr. Okra, was a New Orleans vegetable and fruit vendor who sold while singing from his truck. His family has continued the tradition since his death.

He made an appearance in the 2018 drama film Benji.

References 

1943 births
2018 deaths
People from New Orleans
American farmers